Flavius Virgil Domide (born 7 May 1946) is a Romanian former football striker.

Club career
Flavius Domide started playing football as a child on the streets of the Pânceava neighborhood of Arad where he was born and raised. He later went to play for the juniors of UTA Arad, a team where he would spend most of his senior career, having a total of 342 Divizia A appearances for the club in which he scored 75 goals, a competition in which he made his debut on 28 August 1966 in a 0–0 against Rapid București, also he appeared in 16 matches in which he scored 6 goals in European competitions. He was part of UTA's team that in the 1970–71 European Cup season eliminated Feyenoord who were European champions at that time. Domide, under the guidance of coach Nicolae Dumitrescu also won two consecutive league titles with the team, at the first contributing with 8 goals scored in 30 appearances and in the second he played 29 games and scored 11 goals, also he helped the team reach the 1971–72 UEFA Cup quarter-finals in which he played 8 matches in the campaign, scoring two goals against Austria Salzburg, one against Zagłębie Wałbrzych, one against Vitória Setúbal and his team's only goal in the 3–1 loss on aggregate against Tottenham Hotspur who would eventually win the competition. He spent the last year of his career playing for Vagonul Arad in the third division, helping them gain promotion to the second division.

A book about Domide was written by Radu Romănescu and Ionel Costin, called Flavius Domide – copilul teribil al fotbalului arădean (The terrible child of Arad football), which was released with the occasion of his 70th birthday.

International career
Flavius Domide played 17 matches and scored 3 goals for Romania (19/3 including Romania's Olympic team games), making his debut on 6 November 1968 when coach Angelo Niculescu sent him on the field in the 77th minute in order to replace Nicolae Dobrin in a friendly which ended 0–0 against England. His following game was at the successful 1970 World Cup qualifiers in a 2–0 victory against Switzerland in which he scored a goal, also he was selected by Angelo Niculescu to be part of Romania's squad at the final tournament where he didn't play. He played 5 matches at the 1972 Euro qualifiers, managing to reach the quarter-finals where Romania was defeated by Hungary, who advanced to the final tournament. Domide's last game for the national team was a 1–1 against Finland at the 1974 World Cup qualifiers.

For representing his country at the 1970 World Cup, Domide was decorated by President of Romania Traian Băsescu on 25 March 2008 with the Ordinul "Meritul Sportiv" – (The Medal "The Sportive Merit") class III.

International goals
Scores and results list Romania's goal tally first. "Score" column indicates the score after the player's goal.

Honours
UTA Arad
Divizia A: 1968–69, 1969–70
Vagonul Arad
Divizia C: 1979–80

Notes

References

External links

 Romania National Team 1960–1969 – Details
 Romania National Team 1970–1979 – Details

1946 births
Living people
Sportspeople from Arad, Romania
FC UTA Arad players
Vagonul Arad players
Romanian footballers
Association football forwards
Olympic footballers of Romania
Romania international footballers
Liga I players
Liga III players
1970 FIFA World Cup players
Romanian football managers
FC UTA Arad managers
FC Politehnica Timișoara managers
Békéscsaba 1912 Előre managers
Romanian expatriate football managers
Expatriate football managers in Hungary